The Preet Vihar metro station is located in Preet Vihar on the Blue Line of the Delhi Metro.

Station layout

Facilities
ATMs are available at Preet Vihar metro station.

Connections

See also
List of Delhi Metro stations
Transport in Delhi
Delhi Metro Rail Corporation
Delhi Suburban Railway
List of rapid transit systems in India

References

External links

 Delhi Metro Rail Corporation Ltd. (Official site) 
 Delhi Metro Annual Reports
 
 UrbanRail.Net – descriptions of all metro systems in the world, each with a schematic map showing all stations.

Delhi Metro stations
Railway stations opened in 2010
Railway stations in East Delhi district